United World Rebellion is a duo of extended plays from the American heavy metal band Skid Row. The first and second chapters were released on April 16, 2013 and August 5, 2014 by Megaforce Records and were Skid Row's final recordings with singer Johnny Solinger. A third chapter was planned and scheduled for a 2015 release  but was pushed back to 2016 due to Solinger's departure and pushed back again due to Tony Harnell's sudden departure. The third installment was planned to feature ex-DragonForce lead singer ZP Theart, but he was later replaced by Erik Grönwall. The third chapter was ultimately scrapped with the band's next record having the title The Gang's All Here instead.

Release and promotion

United World Rebellion: Chapter One
United World Rebellion: Chapter One was released on April 16, 2013 and is the band's first EP since 1995, and the first in a set of upcoming EPs over the next 12–18 months. The recording was released by Megaforce Records and sold 1,500 copies in its first week in the US. "Kings of Demolition" was released as a single and features a music video. "This Is Killing Me" was released as the second single and also features a music video.

Rise of the Damnation Army – United World Rebellion: Chapter Two
Rise of the Damnation Army – United World Rebellion: Chapter Two was released on August 5, 2014 by Megaforce, and sold 1,300 copies in the US in its first week. "We Are the Damned" was released as a single and features a music video.

Critical reception

Chapter One: Since its release, the album has been met with mostly positive reception from critics. Music Enthusiast Magazine described the album as "a maelstrom of nostalgic heavy rock, that sounds like what should have been the follow-up to Subhuman Race".

Chapter Two: Crash Crafton of Legendary Rock Interviews said in his review:  "I thoroughly enjoyed the first chapter but this one takes it to a whole new level. They return as aggressive and angry as ever! ... The band is firing on all cylinders and is as cohesive as ever."

Track listing

Chapter One
 "Kings of Demolition" - 4:10
 "Let's Go" - 2:55
 "This Is Killing Me" - 4:56
 "Get Up" - 4:57
 "Stitches" 3:42
 "Fire Fire" (Ezo cover) – 5:51
 "United" (Judas Priest cover) – 3:59

Chapter Two
 "We Are the Damned" – 4:22
 "Give It the Gun" – 3:46
 "Catch Your Fall" – 4:22
 "Damnation Army" – 3:54  
 "Zero Day" – 4:36 
 "Sheer Heart Attack" (Queen cover) – 3:27
 "Rats in the Cellar" (Aerosmith cover) – 4:19

Personnel

Skid Row
Chapters 1 and 2
Johnny Solinger – lead vocals
Dave Sabo – lead guitar, backing vocals
Scotti Hill – rhythm guitar, backing vocals
Rachel Bolan – bass, backing vocals
Rob Hammersmith – drums, backing vocals

References

External links

Skid Row (American band) albums
2013 EPs
2014 EPs
2022 albums
Megaforce Records EPs